Fibuloides japonica is a moth of the family Tortricidae. It is known from China (Zhejiang, Anhui, Fujian, Henan, Hubei, Hunan, Sichuan, Guizhou, Shaanxi), Taiwan, Korea and Japan.

References

Enarmoniini
Moths of Japan
Moths described in 1978